In Hinduism, a Brahmarshi (Sanskrit , a tatpurusha compound of   and ) is a member of the highest class of Rishis ("seers" or "sages").
A Brahmarshi is a sage who has attained enlightenment (Kaivalya or Moksha) and became a Jivanmukta by completely understanding the meaning of Brahman and has attained the highest divine knowledge, infinite knowledge(omniscience) and self knowledge called Brahmajnana. When a Brahmarshi dies he attains Paramukti and frees himself from Samsara, the cycle of birth and death.

Order
The superlative title of Brahmarishi is not attested in the  Vedas themselves and first appears in the Sanskrit epics.

According to this classification, a Brahmarishi is the ultimate expert of religion and spiritual knowledge known as 'Brahmajnana'. Below him are the Maharishis (Great Rishis).

The Saptarishis created out of Brahma's thoughts are perfect brahmarishis. They are often cited to be at par with the Devas in power and piety in the Puranas.

Bhrigu, Angiras, Atri, Vishwamitra, Kashyapa, Vasishta, and Shandilya are the seven brahmarishis. But there is another list of Saptarishi also who are also Gotra-pravartakas, i.e.,founders of Brahamanical clans, and this second list appeared somewhat later, but belongs to ancient period.

All the hymns of third mandala of the Rig Veda, including the Gayatri mantra, are ascribed to Vishwamitra, who is mentioned as the son of Gaadhi.  According to Puranic stories, Vishwamitra was the only brahmarishi who rose to the position out of pure tapas. Originally belonging to the kshatriya, he rose by pure merit to a Brahmarishi. Vishwamitra is also referred to as Kaushika, because he attained Brahmajnana on the banks of the river Koshi.

Parasurama and Jamadagni have also been credited the title of Brahmarishi by Bhishma as in Mahabharata.

The Period of the Manusmriti
Brahmarshi-desha, 'the country of the holy sages,' includes the territories of the Kurus, Matsyas, Panchalas and Surasenas (i.e. the eastern half of the State of Patiala and of the Delhi division of the Punjab, the Alwar State and adjacent territory in Rajputana, the region which lies between the Ganges and the Jumna, and the Mathura District in the United Provinces).

See also

Brahmavarta
Brahmana

Brahmaloka
Brahmastra
Brahmanda astra
Brahmanda Purana
Brahma Sampradaya
Brahma Samhita
Brahma Sutras
Brahma Vaivarta Purana
Manasputra
Hindu texts
Vedic priesthood
Vedanga
Hindu mythology

References

Rishis